Steve Bassett is the name of:

People 
 Steve Bassett (actor), American actor, known as portrayer of Seth Snyder in As the World Turns
 Steve Bassett (musician), music collaborator with Robbin Thompson
 Steve Bassett (advertising), creative director of the Martin Agency who contributed to GEICO Gecko, the company mascot

Characters 
 Steve Bassett, a fictional character of the British soap opera Coronation Street
 Lt. Steve Bassett, a fictional character of the 1936 American film Navy Born